Tenay is a commune in the Ain department in eastern France.

Geography
The river Albarine flows southwest through the commune's eastern part, crosses the village, then flows northwest.

Population

See also
Communes of the Ain department

References

Communes of Ain
Ain communes articles needing translation from French Wikipedia